Ohene Kennedy (born 28 April 1973) is a retired Ghanaian football striker.

Club career
Kennedy's golden days were with Al-Nassr in Saudi Arabia, where he played and scored many goals. He began his professional career at the Mysterious Dwarfs club of Ghana in the 1992–93 season, aged 19.

He joined Al-Nassr in 1993, and soon became one of the team's most valuable players and top scorers. In total, he scored 74 goals for Al-Nassr and won the Saudi league twice; 1994 and 1995, he also was the league's top scorer in 1996 with 14 goals. He had 4 hat-tricks during this period. On 10 November 1996, he scored a hat-trick for Al-Nassr to win 3–2 against Persepolis in the 1996–97 Asian Club Championship quarterfinals.

He later played in Turkey for MKE Ankaragücü and Adanaspor, then in Bangladesh for Dhanmondi Club.

International career
He was part of the Ghanaian 2000 African Nations Cup team, who exited in the quarter-finals after losing to South Africa. He was also a member of the Ghanaian squad at the 1996 Summer Olympics.

Post-Retirement
Kennedy went to live in Croydon, England after retirement from football, where he worked for a transportation company called Dynamic Parcel Distribution (DPD).

Career statistics

International

Statistics accurate as of match played 6 February 2000

Honours

Club 
Al-Nassr
 Saudi Premier League (2): 1993–94, 1994–95

References

External links

 

1973 births
Living people
Ghanaian footballers
Ghana international footballers
Ghanaian expatriate footballers
Expatriate footballers in Bangladesh
Expatriate footballers in Saudi Arabia
Expatriate footballers in Turkey
2000 African Cup of Nations players
Footballers at the 1996 Summer Olympics
Olympic footballers of Ghana
Süper Lig players
Al Nassr FC players
Adanaspor footballers
MKE Ankaragücü footballers
Ebusua Dwarfs players
Ghanaian expatriate sportspeople in Bangladesh
Ghanaian expatriate sportspeople in Turkey
Ghanaian expatriate sportspeople in Saudi Arabia
Saudi Professional League players
Association football forwards